Cape Verde wall gecko, also Santo Antão wall gecko, (Tarentola caboverdiana) is a species of geckos in the family Phyllodactylidae. The species is endemic to Cape Verde, where it occurs in the island of Santo Antão. The species was named by Hans Hermann Schleich in 1984. The specific name caboverdiana refers to Cape Verde, the type locality.

Taxonomy
The former subspecies Tarentola caboverdiana substituta, Tarentola caboverdiana nicolauensis and Tarentola caboverdiana raziana have been elevated to separate species status by Vasconcelos, Perera, Geniez, Harris & Carranza in 2012.

References

Further reading
Schleich, 1984 : Die Geckos der Gattung Tarentola der Kapverden (Reptilia: Sauria: Gekkonidae) [Geckos of the Tarentola Species in Cape Verde]. Courier Forschungsinstitut Senckenberg, vol. 68, p. 95-106. 

Tarentola
Endemic vertebrates of Cape Verde
Geckos of Africa
Reptiles described in 1984
Fauna of Santo Antão, Cape Verde
Taxa named by Hans Hermann Schleich